Wasantha Kumara (born 13 July 1964) is a Sri Lankan former cricketer. He played in 95 first-class and 13 List A matches between 1990/91 and 2001/02. He made his Twenty20 debut on 17 August 2004, for Kurunegala Youth Cricket Club in the 2004 SLC Twenty20 Tournament.

References

External links
 

1964 births
Living people
Sri Lankan cricketers
Kurunegala Youth Cricket Club cricketers
Place of birth missing (living people)